Arthur Jonathan Wall Jr. (November 25, 1923 – October 31, 2001) was an American professional golfer, best known for winning the Masters Tournament in 1959.

Early life
Wall was born and raised in Honesdale, Pennsylvania. He and his younger brother "Dewey" caddied for their parents, starting around age ten, and began playing shortly after. The brothers served in the military during World War II. Art served in the Army Air Forces and Dewey in the Navy. Dewey was killed at the age of 20 in October 1944 when his submarine USS Shark was sunk in the Pacific Ocean near Taiwan.

Amateur career 
Wall won the Pennsylvania Amateur in 1947 and 1949. He attended Duke University and graduated in 1949 with a business degree.

Professional career
Wall won 14 titles on the PGA Tour, including four in 1959. That year he was chosen as the PGA Player of the Year, and also won the money title and Vardon Trophy for lowest scoring average. His most notable career achievement was his victory at the Masters. In the final round in 1959, he birdied five of his last six holes to shoot a 66 and overtake Cary Middlecoff and defending champion Arnold Palmer.

He was a member of three United States Ryder Cup teams: 1957, 1959, and 1961. Wall is also notable for sinking 45 holes-in-one in his playing career (including casual rounds), a world record for many years.

Final win
Wall's final tour win came as a grandfather at age 51 years 7 months at the Greater Milwaukee Open in 1975, which was his first tour win in nine years.

Death
Wall died at the age of 77 from respiratory failure after a lengthy illness. He is buried at Glen Dyberry Cemetery in Honesdale, Pennsylvania.

Amateur wins 
1947 Pennsylvania Amateur
1949 Pennsylvania Amateur

Professional wins (31)

PGA Tour wins (14)

PGA Tour playoff record (5–5)

Caribbean Tour wins (7) 
 1963 Caracas Open
 1964 Maracaibo Open Invitational, Puerto Rico Open, Los Lagartos Open
 1965 Panama Open, Maracaibo Open Invitational
 1966 Maracaibo Open Invitational

Latin American wins (3) 
 1964 Ciudad Baranquilla Open, Mexican Open
 1966 Caracas Open

Other wins (5)
1956 Philadelphia PGA Championship
1962 Philadelphia PGA Championship
1963 Philadelphia PGA Championship
1965 Philadelphia PGA Championship
1971 Philadelphia PGA Championship

Other senior wins (2)
1980 Liberty Mutual Legends of Golf (with Tommy Bolt)
1996 Liberty Mutual Legends of Golf - Demaret Division (with Doug Ford)

Major championships

Wins (1)

Results timeline

Note: Wall never played in The Open Championship.

CUT = missed the half-way cut
WD = withdrew
R64, R32, R16, QF, SF = Round in which player lost in PGA Championship match play
"T" = tied

Summary

Most consecutive cuts made – 7 (1972 PGA – 1976 Masters)
Longest streak of top-10s – 1 (five times)

U.S. national team appearances
Professional
Ryder Cup: 1957, 1959 (winners), 1961 (winners)

References

External links

Duke University Athletics Hall of Fame – Art Wall Jr.
GolfCompendium.com – Art Wall
Trenham Golf History – Art Wall Jr.

American male golfers
Duke Blue Devils men's golfers
PGA Tour golfers
Winners of men's major golf championships
Ryder Cup competitors for the United States
Golfers from Pennsylvania
United States Army Air Forces personnel of World War II
People from Honesdale, Pennsylvania
1923 births
2001 deaths